is the clothing worn by miko in Shinto.

Normally, there are no specific regulations for miko costumes, and each Shinto shrine uses costumes based on its own traditions. Although often confused with miko, there are also women among the Shinto priests. The Kannushi wear different clothing than the miko.

Overview 

The traditional costume for shrine maidens is a white kosode (white robe) with a scarlet hakama. The combination of kosode and hakama is considered to be the working clothes of shrines for both men and women, and they do not serve in this manner. The Shinto priests also wear this outfit under their formal attire. Yellow sumac dye, the color of the Emperor of Japan, and yellow tan, the color of the Crown prince, are forbidden to be used in costumes as "forbidden colors," and dull and gray colors used for funerals are also forbidden to be used.

The shrine maiden's costume is to be handled with care, and the three principles of "Don't throw it" (don't take it off), "Don't put it down" (fold it immediately after putting it on and taking it off), and "Don't step over it" (stepping over it is an act of disrespect to the gods) are emphasized, and the costume is taught to be "treated like a talisman.

Core Costume

White robe 
The  worn on the upper half of the body is a white kosode, with sleeves the length of a tome sleeve..Originally, koshi sleeves were underwear to be worn under daily clothing., The red collar sometimes seen around the neck is a decorative collar (kake-eri)/date collar (date-eri)., It is just a piece of cloth that is placed between the white clothing and the underwear in the style of Kouchiki's Nakabe.

When wearing a white robe, a koshimaki, which is the undergarment, and a hada-juban are worn before the robe. The koshimaki protects the lower half of the body and prevents the hem of the costume from getting caught in the Legs, hence the nicknames "hem-yoke" and "kedashi. On top of this, the upper half of the body is covered with a skin undershirt, which is tied with a cord-like white belt at the area below the ribs (Chest). The collar is placed so that the left side of the collar is up when viewed from oneself. Normally, a half undershirt is used, but in cooler months, a long undershirt that goes below the knees may be added. Today, it is permitted to wear Western-style underwear under the waistband and undershirt.

After the loincloth is put on, the white robe is put on. The white belt is tied below the white belt of the undershirt and hidden by the hakama belt, so that the short sleeves of the undershirt can be seen.

In the old days, the white belt was a white string, but in modern times, it is a wide, elastic band, which is secured with velcro.

Hibakama 

At Kotohira-gū, dark purples are used, and at some shrines, those who have retired from the front line of shrine maidens and remain as clerks wear greens or dark blue hakama.

The scarlet hakama was originally a gusseted hakama used by wives and aristocratic women in the Heian period..Originally, the long hakama covered the ankles, but this was completely designed for indoor use, and it was impossible to stand and walk without kicking up the hem.
 Miko use the kiribakama, a type of hakama used when going out for worship such as Kumano-mode pilgrimages.

In modern times, Shinto priests, including female Shinto priests, wear traditional hakama with gake-like gussets, and in some shrines, mikos also wear hakama with gake-like gussets. Some shrines also require their mikos to wear hakama with gussets. Some shrines also use oguchi hakama.

Like the original scarlet hakama for female courtesans, the lower part of the waist is decorated with six long and seven short white "usawashiito"/sashinui..Contrary to the name of the upper finger thread, this stitch is quite thick to be called a "thread", and two sets of twisted "strings" are used..Unlike martial arts hakama, the Hika Hakama does not have a waistboard. However, the front and back of the hakama are made with a stiff core that serves as a waist board to prevent the hakama from falling apart.

The hakama is divided into front and back sections. After putting the legs through the hakama, the front section is adjusted so that it sits high on the hips, and the back section is adjusted by hooking the front section with a spatula (some scarlet hakama do not have a spatula).. At this point, the knot should be slightly lowered to show the white upper finger thread in front.
.Some shrines also cover the knot with an obi (such as Tsurugaoka Hachimangū).

The length of the obi is longer in the front and shorter in the back, but is usually equal on both sides. However, in the traditional twisted gake-hakama, the obi is different in length on both sides. As mentioned above, the obi is not tied in the front, but is tied with a single hook down the right side, and no waistband is used to secure it.

The fabric used to be Silk, but after 1970s, there are many poplins and chemical fibers that are easy to wash. The tailoring is a single-clothed tailoring only on the table (freshly made). There are two types of awase tailoring with lining (freshly combined). The awase tailoring is for winter only, but the single clothing tailoring is often for the whole year.

Overgarmets

Chihaya 

When a shrine maiden serves a Shinto ritual or performs a shrine maiden dance or Kagura, she wears a Chihaya over the top.

The  has been used since Ancient times, but originally it was just a plain white silk cloth with a vertical cut in the middle. Later, it was made up of two widths of silk as a costume for female officials, and it became a style of clothing in which the sides were not sewn and the front was held together with a munahimo, and then sleeves were added and only the base of the shoulder sleeves were sewn in the current style..The sleeves of Chihaya's kimono do not have kukuri-himo or dewdrops, which are often seen in manga and other creative works.

Normally, the sleeves are made of thin white silk with a thin pattern on it, and only a vermilion chest cord is loosely fastened, leaving the sides of the sleeves and the sides of the body below the armpits unstitched and open. However, depending on the content of the ceremony in which they are to participate (for example, the performance of a shrine maiden dance), Chihaya with more ornate colors and patterns may be used..In addition, the sleeves, back, and the roots of the chest strap are decorated with vermilion chrysanthemum binding.

The design of the Chihaya is called "Aozuri", and "Crane", "Turtle", "Pine", "Chrysanthemum" are often painted in green. In some cases, the God's crest, Cherry blossom, and Plum of the shrine are painted in vermilion or peach.

The fabric is originally silk, but nowadays most of them are made of synthetic fiber. The fabric is thicker than it looks, and extremely thin fabrics such as gauze, which can always be seen through the fabric, are usually not used.

Mo 

The  is an ornament worn at the back of the waist in women's fine kimono. It is a cloth that is trailed from the waist to the back. It is sometimes used in the Urayasu dance and in Kagura and other Shinto rituals.

Plants and pine trees are drawn on a white background, and a long, thin piece of cloth with stitching is drawn on each side.

Haori 

In cold climates, Miko  may be used to protect against the cold. Wool-lined Haori are widely available.

Accessories

Hair 
The long black hair of a miko is often considered part of her costume and she is required to maintain it. The shrine maidens tie their long black hair into a bundle at the back of the head or tie it up with mizuhiki. Mizuhiki is a thin twisted paper twisted with glue, dried and hardened, and usually several strands are put together and dyed different colors from the center, but in the case of miko, it is red and white or all white. For the miko, the color is red and white, while the joucho is white or a combination of gold, silver, red and red.

In addition to this, depending on the content of the ritual, a highly decorative hair clip may be worn. If the length of the hair is short, a hairpiece may be added to add length to the hair and then covered with a hair clip.

In Kanda Shrine, instead of these, she wears her hair back in a purple-colored bag-like hair clip called "Murasaki" (purple).
.

Footwear 
Mikos wear Tabi on their feet, while mikos wear zori or white wooden (or black lacquered) geta (with red or white nosebands), and female mikos wear black lacquered wooden shoes called asagutsu. Nowadays, synthetic materials are allowed to be used as long as they have a good appearance.

In winter, she wears a double layer of tabi socks to protect herself from the cold, and sometimes puts a hand warmer on the inside of her tabi socks.

Headdress 
Head ornaments such as hairpins and crowns, represented by flower ornaments, hairpins, and ori-eda, are used to decorate the head during ceremonies. The ornate hairpin and its ancestor, the kasashira, have elements of both a hair clip and a hair ornament, and are said to be remnants of the ancient practice of pointing flowers and twigs on the head to bring in the spiritual power of trees (nowadays they are often made of artificial flowers or metal).

The crown was originally a sign of status, but female priests used sai sai and mikos wore tengan (heavenly crown) when dancing. There are two types of crowns: one is a full crown and the other is a Tiara-shaped crown, and the latter is called Maetengan.

The latter is called Mae Tenkan (Mae Tengan). In the case of female Shinto priests, Nuka-ate (forehead covering) may be worn depending on the ritual.

Also, at shrines where Ebisu-kou is held, such as Osaka Tenmangū, Imamiya Ebisu Shrine, dressed in miko costumes, sometimes wears a gold Ebisu hat.

Alternative clothing

Suikan 
In some cases, depending on the nature of the ritual, the  may be worn as a miko costume. The  was made a regular costume during the war when a system of female priesthood was established, but was later removed from the official dress code in 1987.

Props 

 also use bells, drums, candles, and bowls of rice in ceremonies.

Torimono 
When a shrine maiden performs a ritual or dance, she may use a prop called a torimono in her hand. The ritual of handing a torimono from a miko to a dancer during a Kagura dance is called "Takarimode".

The items are sakaki, Gohei, staff, sasa, yumi, which are also used in court rituals, sword, hoko yari, Hishaku, kudzu (kadsura), but depending on the shrine, bells, fans, and trays are also widely used. However, in some shrines, bells, fans, and trays are also widely used.

Kagura-zuzu bells are made to look like ears of rice. There are also hoko-suzu, also known as hokosaki-mai-suzu, which resemble spears. There are also tesuzu (hand bells) with handles. Kagura bells have 15 bells (3, 5, and 7 from the top), Hokosuzu have 8 bells under the tsuba, and Tezuzu have 1 bell at the end of the handle. Kagura bells and hoko bells often have a five-colored hanging cloth (bell cord) attached to the bottom of the handle.

The fan is a hinoki fan (hiyougi), of which the women's version  is used. It is decorated with auspicious paintings of white sand and green pine trees, and has artificial flowers and a braided cord attached to the end.

Sake vessels, etc. 
Although not included in the collection, there are Sake sets used by shrine maidens to hold Omiki, Toso, and other rituals such as Wedding.

Choshi (sake bottle) and heishi (ceramic bottle) are used for pouring sake. Choshi for Shinto rituals are made of metal and are not the so-called tokuri made of ceramic. Choshi are double-sided choshi with handles. They are made of tin, copper or brass, and are decorated with Engraving and finished with gold leaf or gilding..For happy occasions, the top of the choshi (sake bottle) is sometimes decorated with twigs of pine needles or red and white mizuhiki.

The recipient's sake cup can be a cup or a square. Cups are usually made of pottery or lacquerware, but in ancient times they were made of unglazed earthenware (kawarake) and were disposable.

In some shrines, mikos carry Kinchaku to carry their personal belongings.

Female priesthood 
After the Meiji Restoration, the government excluded women from the priesthood, but due to the shortage of priests during World War II and after the war, they had to allow female priests. However, later on, for the sake of activity as a Shinto priest, they added the elements of Koshiro's costume and adopted white cloth with twisted gusset hakama and Omoshiro and Karagoromo on top of it as the formal clothes. In 1987, as mentioned above, the suikan was abolished and the omote-gown was used as the regular attire.

References

Bibliography 

 林美一『時代風俗考証事典』河出書房新社, 1977年 ISBN 4-309-22367-2
 江馬 努『風俗史図録 別巻』中央公論社, 1982年 ISBN 4-12-402713-3
 上田正昭・編『平安京から京都へ』小学館, 1994年 ISBN 4-09-387132-9
 小山雲鶴・マンガ技法研究会『衣服の描き方「メイド・巫女編」』グラフィック社, 2001年 ISBN 4-7661-1214-8
 佐野 祐『平成の巫女』原書房, 2003年ISBN 4-562-03719-9
 岡田桃子『神社若奥日記』祥伝社, 2004年 ISBN 4-396-31339-X
 近藤好和『装束の日本史』平凡社, 2007年 ISBN 978-4-582-85357-5
 神田明神『巫女さん入門 初級編』朝日新聞出版, 2008年 ISBN 978-4-02-250457-9
 神田明神『巫女さん作法入門』朝日新聞出版, 2011年 ISBN 978-4-02-250883-6
 朱鷺田祐介『図解 巫女』新紀元社, 2011年（F-FILES No.28） ISBN 978-4-7753-0562-1
 民俗工芸『神祭具便覧40巻』, 2016年
 Fairchild, William P. "Shamanism in Japan", Folklore Studies 21:1–122. (1962)

See also 

 Kimono

Shinto religious clothing
Miko
Pages with unreviewed translations